Carlos M. Richetti (born 23 August 1983) is an Italian baseball player who competed in the 2004 Summer Olympics.

As a member of Italy national baseball team he won two European Baseball Championships, in 2010 and in 2012.

References

1983 births
2015 WBSC Premier12 players
2016 European Baseball Championship players
Baseball players at the 2004 Summer Olympics
Living people
Olympic baseball players of Italy
Nettuno Baseball Club players
Fortitudo Baseball Bologna players
Rimini Baseball Club players